Ashley Hall is a country house standing to the north of the village of Ashley, Cheshire, England.  It dates from the late 16th to the early 17th century, with additions made in the 18th and 19th centuries.  The house is historically important because it was here that the Cheshire gentlemen met in 1715 to decide whether to support the Stuarts or the Hanoverians.  They decided on the latter and later commissioned a set of portraits, which now hang in Tatton Hall.  The house is recorded in the National Heritage List for England as a designated Grade II listed building.  Also listed at Grade II are the gate piers to the forecourt of the building, a carriage house in the forecourt, the kitchen garden wall, and the stable block. For the 2019 biopic Tolkien, 15 acres of the Tatton Estate were used to recreate the trenches of the First World War.

See also

 Listed buildings in Ashley, Cheshire

References

Grade II listed houses in Cheshire
Country houses in Cheshire